The 2018–19 ENPPI season was the 34th season in the football club's history and 15th consecutive and overall season in the top flight of Egyptian football, the Egyptian Premier League, having been promoted from the Egyptian Second Division in 2002. In addition to the domestic league, ENPPI also competed in this season's editions of the domestic cup, the Egypt Cup. The season covered a period from 1 July 2018 to 30 June 2019.

Kit information
Supplier: Nike

Players

Current squad

Out on loan

Transfers

Transfers in

Loans in

Transfers out

Loans out

Notes

Friendly matches

Competitions

Overview

Egyptian Premier League

League table

Results summary

Results by round

Matches

Egypt Cup

Statistics

Appearances and goals

! colspan="9" style="background:#DCDCDC; text-align:center" | Players transferred out during the season
|-

|}

Goalscorers

Clean sheets

References

Notes

ENPPI